"Glorious"  is a song by Swedish singer Måns Zelmerlöw. The song was released as a digital download on 24 November 2016 through Warner Music Group as the third single from his seventh studio album Chameleon (2016). The song did not enter the Swedish Singles Chart, but peaked at number 17 on the Sweden Heatseeker Songs.

Music video
A music video to accompany the release of "Glorious" was first released onto YouTube on 25 November 2016, with a total running length of three minutes and thirty-eight seconds.

Live performances
 Idol (25 November 2016)

Track listing

Chart performance

Weekly charts

Release history

References

2016 songs
2016 singles
Måns Zelmerlöw songs
Songs written by Jez Ashurst
Songs written by Måns Zelmerlöw
Songs written by Emma Rohan